Sjoerd Abel Georges Lodewijk Romme (born 1960) is a Dutch organizational theorist and professor of entrepreneurship and innovation at the Eindhoven University of Technology.

Biography 
Georges Romme received a MSc in economics from Tilburg University and in 1992 a PhD degree in business administration from Maastricht University. Since 2005 he is professor of entrepreneurship and innovation at Eindhoven University of Technology (TU/e), and since 2007 also dean of the Industrial Engineering & Innovation Sciences department.

In the early 1990s, Georges Romme introduced Boolean comparative analysis to the organization and management sciences. He also developed and pioneered the "thesis circle", a tool for collaboratively supervising final (BSc or MSc) projects.

He was one of the original pioneers who brought design thinking and the design sciences to organization studies. A key idea put forward by Romme (2003) and Romme & Endenburg (2006) is that design principles are instrumental in connecting description and explanation (by researchers) to design and construction (by practitioners). As such his work established the idea that social science-based research serves to advance the body of knowledge on management and organization, but needs to be complemented by pragmatic design knowledge for practitioners (e.g. managers, consultants).

Publications 
 1992. A Self-organization Perspective on Strategy Formation, doctoral dissertation, Maastricht University Press.

References

1960 births
Living people
Dutch business theorists
Researchers in organizational studies
Academic staff of the Eindhoven University of Technology
Tilburg University alumni
People from Nijmegen